Semiclassical gravity is the approximation to the theory of quantum gravity in which one treats matter fields as being quantum and the gravitational field as being classical.

In semiclassical gravity, matter is represented by quantum matter fields that propagate according to the theory of quantum fields in curved spacetime. The spacetime in which the fields propagate is classical but dynamical. The curvature of the spacetime is given by the semiclassical Einstein equations, which relate the curvature of the spacetime, given by the Einstein tensor , to the expectation value of the energy–momentum tensor operator, of the matter fields:

where G is the gravitational constant and  indicates the quantum state of the matter fields.

Stress–energy tensor
There is some ambiguity in regulating the stress–energy tensor, and this depends upon the curvature. This ambiguity can be absorbed into the cosmological constant, the gravitational constant, and the quadratic couplings
There's also the other quadratic term 
, 
but (in 4-dimensions) this term is a linear combination of the other two terms and a surface term. See Gauss–Bonnet gravity for more details.

Since the theory of quantum gravity is not yet known, it is difficult to say what is the regime of validity of semiclassical gravity. However, one can formally show that semiclassical gravity could be deduced from quantum gravity by considering N copies of the quantum matter fields, and taking the limit of N going to infinity while keeping the product GN constant. At diagrammatic level, semiclassical gravity corresponds to summing all Feynman diagrams which do not have loops of gravitons (but have an arbitrary number of matter loops). Semiclassical gravity can also be deduced from an axiomatic approach.

Experimental status
There are cases where semiclassical gravity breaks down. For instance, if M is a huge mass, then the superposition

where A and B are widely separated, then the expectation value of the stress–energy tensor is M/2 at A and M/2 at B, but we would never observe the metric sourced by such a distribution. Instead, we decohere into a state with the metric sourced at A and another sourced at B with a 50% chance each. Extensions of semi-classical gravity which incorporate decoherence have also been studied.

Applications
The most important applications of semiclassical gravity are to understand the Hawking radiation of black holes and the generation of random gaussian-distributed perturbations in the theory of cosmic inflation, which is thought to occur at the very beginning of the big bang.

Notes

References
 Birrell, N. D. and Davies, P. C. W., Quantum fields in curved space, (Cambridge University Press, Cambridge, UK, 1982).
 
 
 
 Robert M. Wald, Quantum Field Theory in Curved Spacetime and Black Hole Thermodynamics. University of Chicago Press, 1994.

See also
Quantum field theory in curved spacetime

Quantum gravity